Sprattia is a genus of air-breathing land snail with a clausilium, a terrestrial pulmonate gastropod mollusk in the family Clausiliidae, the door snails.

Species
 Sprattia aksoylari Yildirim, 1997 
 Sprattia aksuensis Nordsieck, 2004
 Sprattia beycola Nordsieck, 1994
 Sprattia bicarinata (Rossmässler, 1839)
 Sprattia blissi (Boettger, 1899)
 Sprattia pseudophrygica Nordsieck, 2004
 Sprattia sillyonensis Nordsieck, 1994
 Sprattia sowerbyana (Pfeiffer, 1850)

References

 Boettger, O. 1883. On new Clausiliæ from the Levant, collected by Vice-Admiral T. Spratt R. N. - Proceedings of the Zoological Society of London 1883: 324-344, Pl. XXXIII-XXXIV

External links
 H. Nordsieck (2004), Turkish Clausiliidae, III: New species taxa of the subfamilies Alopiinae and Mentissoideinae from Anatolia (Gastropoda: Stylommatophora); Stuttgarter Beiträge zur Naturkunde Ser. A, Nr. 670

Clausiliidae